The First Central American Civil War was a civil political and military conflict within the Federal Republic of Central America which lasted from 1826 until 1829. The civil war was fought between Liberal and Conservative lines with Francisco Morazán leading the Liberals and Manuel José Arce, a former Liberal, leading the Conservatives.

Prelude 

Manuel José Arce became the first President of the Federal Republic of Central America on April 29, 1825. On October 10, 1826, Arce dissolved the congress to allow for a new unitary conservatives congress to be elected, turning his back on the liberals which he was a part of. This unconstitutional move was rejected by the Honduran head of state, Dionisio de Herrera, but President Arce did not recognize Herrera's authority, claiming that Herrera's provisional mandate had expired and that he was in power illegitimately. The National Assembly had called for new elections in Honduras, but Herrera ignored the decree and remained in power. For these reasons but under the guise of protecting Copán's tobacco plantations owned by the federal government, Arce decided to oust Herrera.

Civil war

Coup in Honduras 

Dionisio de Herrera was appointed as Head of State of Honduras by the Constituent Assembly on September 16, 1824. According to the Constitution of Honduras of 1825, his mandate would end after only three years on September 16, 1827. Manuel José Arce ordered José Justo Milla, de Herrera's former Deputy Chief of State, to overthrow Dionisio de Herrera in 1827.

On April 4, 1827, General Milla prepared for the attack on the city of Comayagua with 200 men, while General Francisco Morazán led the defense troops of the besieged city. Milla ordered the advance and relentlessly faced the Honduran troops under intense fire. The contest ended with the victory of Milla's forces who proceeded to burn down the capital. President Dionisio Herrera was taken prisoner on May 9 and was sent to Guatemala. José Justo Milla took control of the city while General Morazán managed to leave the capital with Colonel Remigio Díaz and Colonel José Antonio Márquez, arriving in Tegucigalpa, there he is reinforced with 300 men and his intentions are to return to the Comayagua Valley, but at the height of Villa de San Antonio, was attacked by an advance troop under the command of Colonel Hernández and Captain Rosa Medina. Morazán took a defensive position at the La Maradiaga hacienda. In battle on April 29, Colonel Hernández and his invading forces were defeated. Morazán returned to Tegucigalpa to strengthen himself further.

Francisco Morazán, with a safe-conduct, went to Choluteca in southern Honduras, where he met his family in Ojojona but was taken prisoner by the Commander of Arms of Tegucigalpa. He left on bail some 23 days later and was forced to flee to El Salvador on July 28, 1827, with intentions on fleeing to Mexico. He then moved to León in Nicaragua on September 15, 1827, where his friend General José Anacleto Ordóñez, known as "Cleto" Ordóñez, provided him with 135 men to recapture Comayagua. Salvadoran soldiers were then added to the command of Colonel José Zepeda.

Battle of La Trinidad 

In October 1827, Morazán entered Choluteca where Colonel José Antonio Márquez awaited him with a division of men to join the liberating cause. The first Honduran town they arrived in was San Antonio of Texiguat. The town offered Morazán support with weapons and men.

General José Justo Milla discovered the presence of General Francisco Morazán in southern Honduras and quickly moved with his troops to Tegucigalpa, where he established his command headquarters. Morazán went to the town of Sabanagrande to prepare for a decisive fight in the Valle de la Trinidad.

At 9am on November 11, 1827, the first movement of maneuvers was carried out by Colonel Ramón Pacheco. He positioned himself to defend the Avenue that leads from Ojojona to the Valle de la Trinidad. He then attacked Milla's center line. Under the command of Colonel Remigio Díaz, a detachment of 150 men moved along the bank of the Sicatacaro ravine, headed northwest, from Ojojona to Valle la Trinidad and attacked the enemy rear. General Morazán, together with Colonel Román Valladares, surrounded the Caranguije hill and attacked the right flank of the Federal Forces.

The combat intensified for five hours, at 15:00 (3:00 p.m.) the federal troops of Milla were crushed by the men under the command of General Francisco Morazán. The defeated General José Justo Milla and some of his surviving officers fled the battlefield, leaving documents, trunks, and other supplies. There were forty casualties between wounded and dead. The reservist force allied under the command of Colonel José María Gutiérrez Osejo and Captain Francisco Ferrera took no further action to pursue Milla. After this victory, Morazán marched to Tegucigalpa to recapture it on November 12. On November 26, he arrived at the capital Comayagua where he made his triumphal entry and occupied the headquarters of the State of Honduras which was interim chaired by Miguel Eusebio Bustamante. Morazan installed a new government in Honduras by appointing himself as Head of State of Honduras.

War in El Salvador 

After his victory in La Trinidad, Morazán emerged as the leader of the liberal movement and became recognized for his military skills throughout the Federal Republic of Central America. Morazán received calls for help from liberals in El Salvador. Salvadorans opposed the new conservative congressmen and other government officials elected by the decree issued on October 10, 1826. Salvadorans demanded the restitution of former political leaders, but President Arce argued that this measure was necessary to restore constitutional order.

In March 1827 the government of El Salvador responded by military force. Salvadoran troops marched towards Guatemala with the intention of taking the capital of the Republic and toppling Arce's government. However, President Arce himself took command of his federal troops and defeated the Salvadorans in the early hours of March 23 at the Battle of Arrazola. The Salvadoran division dispersed and the officers fled. The field was strewn with corpses, prisoners, weapons, ammunition, and luggage.

After the battle, President Arce ordered two thousand federal troops under the command of General Manuel de Arzú to occupy El Salvador. Meanwhile in Honduras, Francisco Morazán began preparing to recapture El Salvador. He resigned as Head of State of Honduras and has Diego Vigil replace him. He went to Texiguat where he prepared and organized his troops for the Salvadoran campaign.

In April 1828, Morazán went to El Salvador with a force of 1,400 men. This group of militants, known as the Protective Allied Army of the Law, was made up of small groups of Hondurans, Nicaraguans, and Salvadorans who contributed their own tools of war, others with the support of the Indians who served as infantry. Some volunteers followed their liberal convictions, others worked for a political leader, others simply hoped to earn something for their efforts after the war ended. This was the combination of forces that joined Morazán in his fight against federal troops.

While the Salvadoran army faced off against federal forces in San Salvador, Morazán settled in the eastern part of the state. On July 6, Morazán defeated Colonel Vicente Domínguez's troops at the El Gualcho ranch. In his memoirs, Morazán described the battle as follows: 

Morazán kept fighting around San Miguel defeating every platoon sent by General Arzú from San Salvador. The defeats convinced Arzú to leave Colonel Montúfar in charge of San Salvador and to personally deal with Morazán. When the liberal caudillo became aware of Arzú's movements, he left for Honduras to recruit more troops. On September 20, General Arzú was near the Lempa River with five hundred men in search of Morazán when he learned that his forces had capitulated in Mejicanos and San Salvador.

Meanwhile, Morazán returned to El Salvador with a respectable army. General Arzú, fighting illness, fled back to Guatemala, leaving his troops under the command of Lieutenant Colonel Antonio de Aycinena. The colonel and his troops were marching towards Honduran territory when they were intercepted by Morazán's men in San Antonio. On October 9, Aycinena was forced to surrender. With the capitulation of San Antonio, El Salvador was finally free of federal troops. On October 23, General Morazán made his triumphal entry into the Plaza de San Salvador. A few days later, he marched in Ahuachapán, to organize the army with goal of overthrowing conservative aristocrats and ecclesiastics from power in Guatemalan territory and implanting a constitutional order to restore order to the Central American Federation.

On October 20, 1828, the government of Aycinena appointed Antonio José de Irisarri as Minister of War, with the rank of colonel, to restore discipline in the ranks of the Guatemalan army. Irisarri was taken prisoner and was only saved from execution when a soldier pleaded for his life; He was sent on foot to San Salvador bound by arms, where he was imprisoned for nine months.

Upon learning Irisarri's capture, the conservative governor of Guatemala, Mariano de Aycinena y Piñol, attempted to negotiate with Morazán. As he was determined to end the hegemony of the aristocrats and ecclesiastics Guatemalans, Morazán did not accept any deal. Aycinena, seeing that he could not find a peaceful solution, wrote to his fellow citizens:

Push to Guatemala 

In Ahuachapán, Morazán did everything possible to organize a large army. He asked the government of El Salvador to provide him with 4,000 men, but he had to settle for 2,000. When he was in a position to act in early 1829, he sent a division under Colonel Juan Prem to enter Guatemalan territory and take control of Chiquimula. The order was carried out by Prem despite resistance offered by the enemy. Soon after, Morazán moved a small force near Guatemala City to force the enemy out of its trenches and cause the desertion of its troops. Meanwhile, Colonel Vicente Domínguez, who had left Guatemala City with six hundred foot soldiers to attack Prem, learned of the small force that was near Guatemala City. Domínguez changed his plans and went after the small force. This opportunity was seized by Prem who moved from Zacapa and then attacked Domínguez's forces, defeating them on January 15, 1829. After these events, Morazán ordered Prem to continue his march with the 1,400 men under his command and occupy the post of San José Pinula, near the Guatemalan capital.

Meanwhile, the people of Antigua Guatemala organized against the conservative government of Aycinena in Guatemala and put the department of Sacatepéquez under the protection of General Morazán. The allegiance of Sacatepéquez hastened Morazán's invasion into Guatemala. He placed his men in the town of San José Pinula near Guatemala City. Military operations in the capital began with small skirmishes in front of the government fortifications. On February 15, one of the largest divisions of Morazán's army, under the command of Cayetano de la Cerda, was defeated in Mixco by federal troops. Due to this defeat, Morazán lifted the siege of the city and concentrated its forces in Antigua. A division of federal troops followed him from the capital under the command of Colonel Pacheco in the direction of Sumpango in Sacatepéquez and El Tejar in Chimaltenango with the purpose of attacking him in Antigua. But Pacheco extended his forces, leaving some of them in Sumpango. When he arrived in San Miguelito on March 6 with a smaller army, he was defeated by General Morazán, which once again raised the morale of the men of the liberal leader.

After San Miguelito's victory, Morazán's army increased in numbers when Guatemalan volunteers joined its ranks. On March 15 when Morazán and his army were on their way to occupy their previous positions, he was intercepted by Colonel Prado's federal troops at the Las Charcas ranch. Morazán, in a superior position, crushed Prado's army. The battlefield was strewn with corpses, and the Allies took numerous prisoners and seized a considerable number of weapons. Subsequently, Morazán mobilized to regain his former positions in San José Pinula and El Aceituno, and again began a siege on Guatemala City. General Verveer tried to mediate between the State Government and Morazán, but they could not reach an agreement. Military operations continued with great success for the Allied Army.

To prepare the defense of the city and threatened by the troops of Morazán, Aycinena ordered on March 18, 1829 that the death penalty would be applied to everyone who aided the enemy. He made a proclamation invoking the defense of sanctity of the altars and issued a legal provision by which liberal leaders Pedro Molina Mazariegos, his son, Esteban Molina, Antonio Rivera Cabezas, and military leaders José Anacleto Ordóñez, Nicolás Raoul, and Isidoro Saget were declared enemies of the state.

On April 12, the head of state of Guatemala, Mariano de Aycinena y Piñol, capitulated. The next day, the Plaza Central was occupied by Morazán's troops.

Aftermath 

Immediately after the surrender of Guatemala City on April 13, President Arce, Mariano Aycinena, Mariano Beltranena y Llano, and all the officials who had had a role in the war, were imprisoned. After these events, General Morazán led Central America for three months until June 26, 1829 until Congress appointed Senator Juan Barrundia as President of Central America. Morazán expelled Aycinena and Piñol, Guatemalan conservative aristocrats, and most of the members of the Aycinena Clan that he directed, along with his allies, members of the main regular orders, and senior clergy of the Catholic Church. Not content with the expulsions, he confiscated all their property.

On June 4, 1829, the Morazán government issued a law imposing the death penalty on all members of the Aycinena Clan who had participated in the conservative government of Guatemala, including Irisarri, prior to the return to the treasury of the wages from his three years of work and the confiscation of all his property. Irisarri managed to escape from the Salvadoran prison on January 7, 1830 and embarked from Acajutla for Guayaquil, in Ecuador, where he took refuge.

See also 

Federation of Central America
Second Central American Civil War

References 

Federal Republic of Central America
History of Central America
History of Guatemala
History of Costa Rica
History of El Salvador
History of Honduras
History of Nicaragua
1820s in North America
19th century in Central America
19th century in Costa Rica
19th century in El Salvador
19th century in Guatemala
19th century in Honduras
19th century in Nicaragua